Lake Baringo is, after Lake Turkana, the most northern of the Kenyan Rift Valley lakes, with a surface area of  and an elevation of . The lake is fed by several rivers: the  Molo, Perkerra and Ol Arabel. It has no obvious outlet; the waters are assumed to seep through lake sediments into the faulted volcanic bedrock. It is one of the two freshwater lakes in the Rift Valley in Kenya, the other being Lake Naivasha.

The lake is in a remote hot and dusty area with over 470 species of birds, occasionally including migrating flamingos. A Goliath heronry is located on a rocky islet in the lake known as Gibraltar.

Description
The lake is part of the East African Rift system. The Tugen Hills, an uplifted fault block of volcanic and metamorphic rocks, lies west of the lake. The Laikipia Escarpment lies to the east.

Water flows into the lake from the Mau Hills and Tugen Hills. It is a critical habitat and refuge for more than 500 species of birds and fauna, some of the migratory waterbird species being significant regionally and globally. The lake also provides a habitat for seven fresh water fish species. One, Oreochromis niloticus baringoensis (a Nile tilapia subspecies), is endemic to the lake. Lake fishing is important to local social and economic development. Additionally the area is a habitat for many species of animals including the hippopotamus (Hippopotamus amphibius), Nile crocodile (Crocodylus niloticus) and many other mammals, amphibians, reptiles and the invertebrate communities.

While stocks of Nile tilapia in the lake are now low, the decline of this species has been mirrored by the success of another, the marbled lungfish (Protopterus aethiopicus) which was introduced to the lake in 1974 and which now provides the majority of fish from the lake. Water levels have been reduced by droughts and over-irrigation. The lake is commonly turbid with sediment, partly due to intense soil erosion in the catchment area, especially on the Loboi Plain south of the lake.

A recent study showed that there were both positive and negative relationships between some water quality parameters and the prevalence of recovered parasites. O. niloticus baringoensis from Lake Baringo also recorded high parasite prevalence and this calls for sensitization of the public on the risks that may arise from the consumption of undercooked infected fish.

The lake has several small islands, the largest being Ol Kokwe Island. Ol Kokwe, an extinct volcanic centre related to Korosi volcano north of the lake, has several hot springs and fumaroles, some of which have precipitated sulfur deposits. A group of hot springs discharge along the shoreline at Soro near the northeastern corner of the island.

Several important archaeological and palaeontological sites, some of which have yielded fossil hominoids and hominins, are present in the Miocene to Pleistocene sedimentary sequences of the Tugen Hills.

The main town near the lake is Marigat, while smaller settlements include Kampi ya Samaki and Loruk. The area is increasingly visited by tourists and is situated at the southern end of a region of Kenya inhabited largely by pastoralist ethnic groups including Il Chamus, Rendille, Turkana and Kalenjin. Accommodation, (hotels, self-catering cottages and camping sites) as well as boating services are available at and near Kampi-Ya-Samaki on the western shore, as well as on several of the islands in the lake.

A Kenyan Government report in 2021 estimated that the surface area of Lake Baringo had increased by over 100% to 268 square kilometres over the period 2010-2020. Lakeside villages were flooded and people displaced.

See also 
 Rift Valley lakes
 Korosi, a volcano at the northern end of Lake Nakuru

References 

Lakes of the Great Rift Valley
Lakes of Kenya
Endorheic lakes of Africa
Ramsar sites in Kenya